Birboneh-ye Bala (also Romanized as Bīrboneh-ye Bālā; also known as Bīr Boneh and Bīrboneh) is a village in Kisom Rural District, in the Central District of Astaneh-ye Ashrafiyeh County, Gilan Province, Iran. At the 2006 census, its population was 111, in 37 families.

References 

Populated places in Astaneh-ye Ashrafiyeh County